Zhao Fulin (born July 1932) is a Chinese politician who served as party secretary of Guangxi from 1990 to 1997 and chairman of Guangxi People's Congress from 1995 to 2002.

He was a member of the 13th and 14th Central Committee of the Chinese Communist Party.

Biography
Zhao was born in Daming County, Hebei, in July 1932. He graduated from South Hebei Military and Political Cadre School and the Central Party School of the Chinese Communist Party. 

He was appointed deputy party secretary of Jingzhou in August 1966, concurrently serving as party secretary of Jiangling County. In October 1983, he was elevated to party secretary of Jingzhou, the top political position in the city. He was appointed deputy party secretary of Hubei in December 1985, in addition to serving as secretary of the Discipline Inspection Commission.

In October 1990, he was transferred to southwest China's Guangxi Zhuang Autonomous Region and appointed party secretary. He also served as chairman of Guangxi People's Congress between January 1995 and January 2002.

References

1932 births
Living people
People from Daming County
Central Party School of the Chinese Communist Party alumni
People's Republic of China politicians from Hebei
Chinese Communist Party politicians from Hebei
Members of the 13th Central Committee of the Chinese Communist Party
Members of the 14th Central Committee of the Chinese Communist Party